Susan Pope is an American Republican politician from Wayland, Massachusetts. She represented the 13th Middlesex district in the Massachusetts House of Representatives from 1997 to 2006.

See also
 1997-1998 Massachusetts legislature
 1999-2000 Massachusetts legislature
 2001-2002 Massachusetts legislature
 2003-2004 Massachusetts legislature
 2005-2006 Massachusetts legislature

References

Year of birth missing
Year of death missing
Members of the Massachusetts House of Representatives
Women state legislators in Massachusetts
20th-century American women politicians
20th-century American politicians
People from Wayland, Massachusetts